Farshad Alizadeh Kalehkeshi is an Iranian wrestler.

References

Living people
Iranian male sport wrestlers
Asian Games bronze medalists for Iran
Islamic Azad University, Central Tehran Branch alumni
Asian Games medalists in wrestling
Wrestlers at the 2010 Asian Games
World Wrestling Championships medalists
1985 births
Medalists at the 2010 Asian Games
Asian Wrestling Championships medalists
21st-century Iranian people